Ibrahima Diaw (born 9 July 1992) is a Senegalese table tennis player. He competed in the 2020 Summer Olympics.

Diaw was born in France to a Senegalese father and a Malian mother. He grew up in Paris and competed for France at the junior level.

References

1992 births
Living people
Sportspeople from Paris
Sportspeople from Copenhagen
Table tennis players at the 2020 Summer Olympics
Senegalese male table tennis players
Olympic table tennis players of Senegal